Mumbai Chhatrapati Shivaji Maharaj Terminus – Nagpur Junction Duronto Express is a daily service train which runs between Nagpur Junction, the second Capital of Maharashtra after Mumbai and Chhatrapati Shivaji Maharaj Terminus, Mumbai. The train is the most popular on this route. The Duronto Express was introduced in November 2009. It is considered as the fastest daily service Express on NGP-CSMT Central Railway line.

Stoppages
Being a Duronto Express, it does not stop at any other station in between. However it does stop at Bhusawal Junction as a technical Halt. It also stops at Igatpuri and Kasara for removal and addition of banker engines. But from 1 January 2016 all/some technical halts are converted to commercial halt. Thus tickets are issued from Nagpur, Bhusaval, Igatpuri and Mumbai.

Locomotive

Previously, a WCAM 2/2P or WCAM 3 used to haul the train from Mumbai Chhatrapati Shivaji Maharaj Terminus to Igatpuri (technical halt) following which it got either a WAP 4 of Bhusawal Electric Loco Shed or WAP 7 of Ajni Electric Loco Shed.

With Central Railway completing the change over of 1500 V DC traction to 25,000 V AC traction on 6 June 2015, this train is now hauled end to end by Ajni-based WAP 7.

Coach composition

The coach composition of the Nagpur Duronto leaving NGP is as follows:-

WAP7-EOG-AB1-H1-A1-A2-B1-B2-B3-B4-S1-S2-S3-S4-S5-S6-S7-S8-EOG.

The train also runs with 24 coaches having extra 3-Tier coaches added on seasonal basis & as per demand.

From 23 February 2019, this train now runs with pure LHB coaches.

Other Trains on the Nagpur-Mumbai Route
Jnaneswari Express, Samarsata Express, Gitanjali Express, Kolkata Mail via Nagpur, Vidarbha Express, Sewagram Express, Shalimar Express and some other trains ply on this route with travel time varying from 16 hours to 13 hours. However the Nagpur Duronto is the fastest option for this route as it manages to connect the two cities in just 11 hrs.

See also

 Duronto Express
 Vidarbha Express

Sources

 (2289)

References

Transport in Mumbai
Duronto Express trains
Transport in Nagpur
Rail transport in Maharashtra
Railway services introduced in 2010